Cytoplasmic dynein 1 heavy chain 1 is a protein that in humans is encoded by the DYNC1H1 gene.

Interactions
DYNC1H1 has been shown to interact with PAFAH1B1 and CDC5L.

Clinical relevance
Mutations in this gene have been shown to cause dominant axonal Charcot-Marie-Tooth disease as well as spinal muscular atrophy with lower extremity predominance 1 (SMA-LED1).

References

Further reading

External links